Bălăşeşti may refer to:

Bălășești, Galați, a commune in Galați County, Romania
Bălăşeşti, Sîngerei, a commune in Sîngerei district, Moldova
 Bălăşeşti, a village in Răculeşti Commune, Criuleni district, Moldova